Damarla Chennapa Nayakar was a Nayakar ruler of Kalahasti and Vandavasi under the suzerainty of Vijayanagar emperor Venkatapati Raya. He was also the Dalavoy or the  Commander-in-Chief of the emperor. The line of Nayakars were chieftains during the Vijayanagar empire and attained full power after its decline, becoming independent Nayakars.

The city of Chennai (originally called "Chennapatinnam") was founded by his sons, Venkatappa and Ayyappa, and named after Chennapa Nayakar. It was established in order to separate the warring Europeans within the region, the Dutch based at Pulicat and the Portuguese based at Mylapore. Later the British establishment at Madras (Fort St. George) was set up to the south of Chennapata.

Notes

References

Further reading
 Velcheru Narayana Rao and David Shulman, Sanjay Subrahmanyam. Symbols of substance : court and state in Nayaka period Tamilnadu (Delhi ; Oxford : Oxford University Press, 1998) ; xix, 349 p., [16] p. of plates : ill., maps ; 22 cm. ; Oxford India paperbacks ; Includes bibliographical references and index ; .
K.A. Nilakanta Sastry, History of South India, From Prehistoric times to fall of Vijayanagar, 1955, OUP, (Reprinted 2002) .

History of Chennai
Telugu monarchs